Charles Chibwe (1962 – 2 April 1983) was a Zambian judoka. He competed in the men's extra-lightweight event at the 1980 Summer Olympics. He was killed when the car he was in crashed into the Zambezi river.

References

External links
 

1962 births
1983 deaths
Zambian male judoka
Olympic judoka of Zambia
Judoka at the 1980 Summer Olympics
Place of birth missing
Road incident deaths in Zambia